Zunongwangia profunda is a Gram-negative and aerobic bacterium from the genus of Zunongwangia.

References

Flavobacteria
Bacteria described in 2007